The 2021 Liberty Bowl was a college football bowl game played on December 28, 2021, with kickoff at 6:45 p.m. EST (5:45 p.m. local CST) and televised on ESPN. It was the 63rd edition of the Liberty Bowl, and was one of the 2021–22 bowl games concluding the 2021 FBS football season. Sponsored by automotive retailer AutoZone, the game was officially known as the AutoZone Liberty Bowl.

Teams
Consistent with conference tie-ins, the game was played between teams from the Southeastern Conference (SEC) and the Big 12 Conference.

This was the eighth meeting between Mississippi State and Texas Tech, with the most recent prior meeting coming in 1970; the Bulldogs led the all-time series, 4–2–1.

Mississippi State Bulldogs

Mississippi State, from the SEC, finished the regular season with an overall record of 7–5. This was the Bulldogs' third Liberty Bowl appearance, having appeared in the 2007 and 2013 editions, winning both. In 2007, Mississippi State defeated UCF, 10–3. In the 2013 game, the Bulldogs defeated Rice, 44–7. Mississippi State head coach Mike Leach was the head coach at Texas Tech from 2000 to 2009.

Texas Tech Red Raiders

Texas Tech, from the Big 12, finished the regular season with an overall record of 6–6. This was the Red Raiders' first Liberty Bowl appearance. The team was led by interim head coach Sonny Cumbie, who was the starting quarterback at Texas Tech during the 2004 season, playing for Leach.

Game summary

Statistics

References

Externals links
Game statistics at statbroadcast.com

Liberty Bowl
Liberty Bowl
Mississippi State Bulldogs football bowl games
Texas Tech Red Raiders football bowl games
Liberty Bowl
Liberty Bowl